This article lists the confirmed squads lists for 2005 Men's EuroHockey Nations Championship from August 28 to September 4, 2005 at the complex of hockeyclub ATV Leipzig in Leipzig, Germany.

Group A

Head coach: Giles Bonnet

Head coach: Jason Lee

Head coach: Bernhard Peters

Head coach: Mathias Ahrens

Group B

Head coach: Bertrand Reynaud

Head coach: Roelant Oltmans

Head coach: Maciej Matuszynski

Head coach: Maurits Hendriks

References
Deutscher Hockey Bund

Squads
2005